The 2021 Tarleton State Texans football team represented Tarleton State University in the 2021 NCAA Division I FCS football season. The Texans played their home games at Memorial Stadium in Stephenville, Texas, and were coached by Todd Whitten.
Due to the NCAA's transition rules, they were not eligible for the 2021 FCS Playoffs.

Previous season

The Texans finished the 2020–21 season 5–3 overall record.

Preseason

Preseason polls

WAC Poll
The Western Athletic Conference coaches released their preseason poll on July 27, 2021. The Texans were picked to finish third in the conference.  In addition, several Texans were selected to both the preseason WAC Offense and Defense teams.

 Note: Dixie State is not included since they are not playing a full WAC schedule due to previous non-conference game contracts.  Dixie State players are eligible for individual awards.

Preseason All–WAC Team

Offense

Tariq Bitson – Wide Receiver, GR
Zachery Perry – Offensive Lineman, SR

Defense

Ronnell Wilson – Linebacker, SR
Devin Hafford – Defensive Back, SR

Schedule

References

Tarleton State
Tarleton State Texans football seasons
Tarleton State Texans football